Sir Walter Baldwin Spencer  (23 June 1860 – 14 July 1929), commonly referred to as Baldwin Spencer, was a British-Australian evolutionary biologist, anthropologist and ethnologist. He is known for his fieldwork with Aboriginal peoples in Central Australia, contributions to the study of ethnography, and academic collaborations with Frank Gillen. Spencer introduced the study of zoology at the University of Melbourne and held the title of Emeritus Professor until his death in 1929. He was elected a Fellow of the Royal Society in 1900 and knighted in 1916.

Early life and education
Spencer was born on 23 June 1860 in Stretford, Lancashire, England to Martha (née Circuit) and Rueben Spencer. He was educated at Old Trafford school and Manchester School of Art, where he received training in drawing.

In 1879, Spencer began study at Owens College (University of Manchester), where he first developed an interest in evolutionary biology.  In 1884, he obtained a BA in biology from the University of Oxford, with first-class honours. Through his time at Oxford, Spencer attended lectures by anthropologist Edward Burnett Tylor, which began a lifelong interest in the field. 

As a graduate, Spencer worked as a teaching assistant to his former professor Henry Nottidge Moseley, where he aided in the transferral of General Pitt-Rivers's collection of anthropological artefacts from the South Kensington Museum to Oxford University, which had built a museum to house it. He obtained a fellowship at Lincoln College, Oxford in 1886.

Career

Move to Melbourne

Having already contributed various papers to scientific journals, one of which, on the Pineal eye in lizards, had aroused much interest, and having applied for the professorship of biology at Melbourne in June 1886 was elected to that chair in January 1887.

Spencer arrived in Australia in March of that year and set about organising his new school (the chair had just been founded), successfully receiving a building grant of £8000 to develop new lecture rooms and laboratories. He showed much capability as a lecturer and organiser, and also took a full part in the general activities of the university. His interests were not confined to his university duties; he took a leading part in the proceedings of the Royal Society of Victoria, the Field Naturalists Club of Victoria, and the Australasian Association for the Advancement of Science, and did valuable work for those bodies.

Expeditions and museum work
In 1894 a new field was opened up for Spencer when he joined the W.A. Horn scientific expedition which left Adelaide in May 1894 to explore Australia. In July he met Francis James Gillen at Alice Springs with whom he was to be so much associated in the study of the Aboriginal peoples. The expedition covered some 2000 miles in about three months and on his return Spencer busied himself with editing the report, to which he also largely contributed. It was published in 1896. In November 1896 Spencer was again at Alice Springs beginning the work with Gillen which resulted in Native Tribes of Central Australia, published in 1899 and partly opposed by Carl Strehlow and Moritz von Leonhardi. He continued this work with Gillen during the vacations of the two following years. A large amount of material relating to tribal customs was accumulated, and the book appeared with the names of both Gillen and Spencer on the title page. D. J. Mulvaney, writing about Spencer in the Australian Dictionary of Biography, tells us that while Spencer was "a kindly humanitarian in practice, in theory he saw Aboriginal people simply as dehumanised 'survivals' from an early stage of social development" and that while records are invaluable, he nonetheless made "unacceptable value judgements" on indigenous Australians. 

Spencer was recruited as science writer for the Australasian by its editor, David Watterston.

Spencer had been appointed a trustee of the public library in 1895. When Sir Frederick McCoy died in May 1899, Spencer became honorary director of the national museum. He was to do an enormous amount of work in the following years, and to present to the museum many valuable collections of sacred and ceremonial Aboriginal objects collected during his journeys. He was elected a fellow of the Royal Society, London.

In 1900 and in 1901 he spent 12 months in the field with Gillen going from Oodnadatta to Powell Creek and then eastward to Borraloola on the Gulf of Carpentaria.  They were assisted with their work by the artist and interpreter known to Europeans as Jim Kite, Erlikilyika, who lived at Charlotte Waters telegraph station, where Gillen had previously spent some years. Their experiences and studies formed the basis of the next book, The Northern Tribes of Central Australia, which appeared in 1904, dedicated to David Syme, who had given £1000 towards the cost of the expedition. Patrick ("Pado") Byrne, telegraph master at Charlotte Waters, corresponded with Spencer for many years and collected biological specimens. Spencer named a small marsupial known locally as the kowari in recognition of Byrne's contribution as Dasyuroides byrnei.

In 1904, Spencer became president of the professorial board, an office he was to hold for seven years. There was then no paid vice-chancellor at Melbourne university and much administrative work fell on Spencer's shoulders. Outside of these duties, he took an interest in the sporting activities of the undergraduates. He was President of the Melbourne University Sports Union and later was the President of the Victorian Football League from 1919 to 1925.
In 1911 at the request of the Commonwealth government he led an expedition in the Northern Territory sent to make inquiries into conditions there, and in the following year he published his Across Australia and also accepted the position of special commissioner and chief Protector of Aborigines. The story of this will be found in Native Tribes of the Northern Territory of Australia (1914).

In 1914 Spencer was honorary secretary for the meeting of the British Association for the Advancement of Science held in Melbourne. He also did work for the national museum. In 1916 at the request of the Felton Bequest's committee he went to England to obtain an art adviser for the Felton Bequest. He took an interest in Australian artists. He had been made CMG in 1904 and in 1916 he was created a KCMG in 1919 he resigned his professorship and in 1920 became vice-president of the trustees of the public library of Victoria. Spencer was awarded the Clarke Medal in 1923.

Clashes with Carl Strehlow
Spencer held very different views on the Aranda people (now often referred to as Arrernte) from missionary Carl Strehlow. Spencer's more pessimistic view saw decline, while Strehlow saw creativity and a future for them. Strehlow's son, Ted Strehlow, mentions this in his book Songs of Central Australia (1971), defending his father from Spencer's criticism. He shows that Spencer and Gillen were limited by their lack of language competence when extracting information from Indigenous peoples, whereas his father was a fluent speaker and writer of the local languages.  Spencer and Gillen famously described the Aranda as "naked savages... chanting songs of which they do not know the meaning" in The Northern Tribes of Central Australia (1904).

A controversy arose in anthropological circles, after Spencer wrote "angry and to some degree defamatory letters" to Andrew Lang and Sir James Frazer about Strehlow's work. Strehlow's book, Die Aranda- und Loritja-Stämme in Zentral-Australien (published in parts, between 1907 and 1920), challenged some of the findings of Spencer and Gillen's The Native Tribes of Central Australia (1899), which had been accepted by anthropologists as a true picture of the Aranda people. This led to a major controversy among British anthropologists, involving Andrew Lang, Sir James Frazer, Robert Ranulph Marett, A.C. Haddon, Spencer and later Bronisław Malinowski. The debate centred on whether Aboriginal people were primitive, on a lower level of evolution than Europeans (Frazer and Spencer's view) or a decadent people who had previously been on a higher level of culture (Strehlow's view).

From 1912 to 1922, Spencer attempted to shut down Strehlow's Hermannsburg Mission. In his 1913 report as Special Commissioner and Chief Protector, Spencer proposed taking all Aboriginal children away from their parents and setting up reserves where the children would be denied any contact with their parents, be prevented from speaking their languages and made incapable of living in the bush. While recognising that "this will undoubtedly be a difficult matter to accomplish and will involve some amount of hardship so far as the parents are concerned", Spencer justified it on the grounds that "once the children have grown to a certain age and have become accustomed to camp life with its degrading environment and endless roaming about in the bush, it is almost useless to try and reclaim them". So he thought it essential to take them away, for "then they will gradually lose the longing for a nomad life and will in fact become incapable of securing their living in the bush". He was particularly keen to make sure that "half-caste" children had no contact with camp life. Hermannsburg was to be taken away from the Lutherans and "serve as a reserve for the remnants of the southern central tribes where they can, under proper and competent control, be trained to habits of industry". However, when the Administrator of the Northern Territory, John A. Gilruth, came down from Darwin in 1913 to see whether these negative reports were true, he was impressed with what he saw and decided that the Strehlows and the mission should remain.

Further travels

Spencer paid two more visits to the centre of Australia, one in 1923 with Dr Leonard Keith Ward, the government geologist of South Australia, and the other in 1926. These visits enabled Spencer to revise his earlier researches and consider on the spot various opposing theories that had been brought forward. His The Arunta: a Study of a Stone Age People (1927), revisits and reaffirms his earlier conclusions; Gillen's name as joint author appeared on the title-page though he had died 15 years before. Wanderings in Wild Australia, published a year later and slightly more popular in form, completes the list of his books. A list of his other published writings will be found in Spencer's Last Journey (1931). Spencer went to London in 1927 to see these books through the press. Ten years before he had said that he realised he was not getting younger and must regard his field work as finished. In February 1929, however, in his sixty-ninth year, he travelled in a cargo boat to Magallanes and then went in a little schooner to Ushuaia at the south of Tierra del Fuego.

Personal life 
Spencer married Mary Elizabeth ('Lillie') Bowman in January 1887. The couple had two daughters, and a son who died in infancy.

Death 
Spencer died from heart failure on 14 July 1929 during an expedition to Tierra del Fuego, Chile/Argentina. The events leading to his death are recorded in Spencer's own journal entries, and that of his research assistant Jean Hamilton. He was buried in Magallanes (Punta Arenas), Chile.

Legacy
In 2009, an Australian Research Council project was established with the aim of aggregating and digitising the original Spencer and Gillen collection. 

The Baldwin Spencer Building at the University of Melbourne was built in 1888 and named for Spencer in 1920. it was listed on the Victorian Heritage Register on 24 June 1992.

In 1976, Australia Post issued a postage stamp bearing Spencer's portrait.

Spencer is commemorated in the scientific names of two species of Australian lizards: Pseudemoia spenceri and Varanus spenceri.

Selected works

Spencer, Walter Baldwin (1931). Spencer's Last Journey. Being a Journal of an Expedition to Tierra Del Fuego by the Late Sir Baldwin Spencer. With a Memoir. Oxford: Clarendon Press.  Edited by R. R. Marett and T. K. Penniman.

References

Further reading

External links

1860 births
1929 deaths
People from Stretford
Alumni of Exeter College, Oxford
Fellows of Lincoln College, Oxford
English emigrants to colonial Australia
Australian anthropologists
Social anthropologists
Australian biologists
Australian Knights Commander of the Order of St Michael and St George
British anthropologists
Fellows of the Royal Society
VFL/AFL administrators